Mashak or Moshak in Iran may refer to:
 Mashak-e Sepahdari
 Mashak-e Tehranchi